The Gladiators of Rome is an action strategy game.

References

Windows games
Video games set in ancient Rome
Multiplayer and single-player video games
Activision games
Windows-only games
Cat Daddy Games games